Dennis Lloyd, Baron Lloyd of Hampstead, QC (22 October 1915 – 31 December 1992) was a British jurist, and was created a life peer on 14 May 1965 as Baron Lloyd of Hampstead, of Hampstead in the London Borough of Camden.

He was appointed Quain Professor of Law at the University of London in 1956, and Head of Department of Laws from 1969 to 1981. He became a Queen's Counsel in 1975. He was an architect of the Rent Act of 1965.

Publications
 The Idea of Law (1964) 
 Introduction to Jurisprudence (1959)

References 

Crossbench life peers
English legal scholars
1915 births
1992 deaths
Academics of University College London
British King's Counsel
Life peers created by Elizabeth II
20th-century King's Counsel